Julien Garnier (born at Connerré, France, 6 January 1642; d. in Quebec, 1730) was a French Jesuit missionary to Canada.

Life
He entered the Society of Jesus in 1660, and, in October, 1662, sailed for Canada, he taught at the Jesuit college while he prepared for missionary work studying the Indian languages. He was ordained in 1668, the first Jesuit to be there.

He went first to the Oneida, but in a few months changed the field of his labours to the Onondaga mission. Garaconthié, the Onondaga chief, received him with every evidence of friendship, and, at his request, rebuilt the chapel of St. Mary.

On the arrival of other missionaries in 1671, Garnier set out with Father Jacques Frémin for the Seneca Nation country. There he found a bare handful of Christian Indians at the Gandachioragou mission. He immediately began to preach and baptize; and he persevered after his chapel was destroyed by a fire which wiped out the entire village.

When trouble arose in 1683 between the French and the Senecas, Garnier went with de Lamberville to Governor de la Barre to urge compromise and moderation. He was unable, however, to dissuade the latter from his policy of repression. De la Barre set out upon the ill-starred expedition which was to prevent priests from venturing among the northern tribes for over thirteen years.

Every missionary was recalled at the outbreak of hostilities and Garnier was sent in turn to the settlements of Sault-Saint-Louis, Lorette and Caughnawaga. When access to the Indians was made possible by the treaty of Montreal, in 1701, Garnier returned to his mission among the Senecas. There he remained until 1709, when Schuyler's expedition once more made it necessary for him to return to Canada. His departure marked the end of missionary work among the Senecas; his notes and letters remain one of the principal and most accurate sources of information on this division of the Iroquois.

In 1716 Garnier became superior of the missions in New France. He passed his remaining years among the various settlements along the St. Lawrence River, retiring from active life in 1728.

References

Attribution
 The entry cites:

External links 
 Biography at the Dictionary of Canadian Biography Online

1642 births
1730 deaths
17th-century French Jesuits
French Roman Catholic missionaries
18th-century French Jesuits
Roman Catholic missionaries in Canada
Jesuit missionaries in New France